Malaisinia is a genus of tephritid  or fruit flies in the family Tephritidae.

Species
Malaisinia pulcherrima Hering, 1938

References

Tephritinae
Tephritidae genera
Diptera of Asia